is a Japanese politician and the current governor of Nagano Prefecture, assuming office in 2010. In 2014, he was re-elected for another four-year term as the governor of the prefecture.

References 

1960 births
Living people
Politicians from Tokyo
People from Kunitachi, Tokyo
University of Tokyo alumni
Governors of Nagano